Savion Einstein (born April 27, 1982) is an Israeli screenwriter and producer. The daughter of the late sports broadcaster Meir Einstein, she has written numerous advertisements and screenplays. Her work has been recognised with several honours, including a Joplin Award and a nomination for the Nicholl Fellowships in Screenwriting. In 2018, her screenplay Superfecundation was sold to Sony's production company Screen Gems.

Biography
The advertisements Einstein produced, among them, Fox Fashion's Forever Young with Bar Refaeli and Noam Tor, Of Tov’s (Good Chicken) with Dror Keren, and First International Bank's Popcorn with Assi Cohen, won the Golden Cactus and Effie Awards. From 2012 to 2013, Einstein served as a film critic on the website "Seret" ("Film"), where she reviewed films such as "At Any Price", "Blue Jasmine", "Take This Waltz", and "Killing Them Softly", to name a few.

In 2007, Einstein interned as a script reader at the production company of Academy Award winning screenwriter and producer Steve Zaillian. In 2014, Einstein relocated to Los Angeles. That same year, a screenplay Einstein wrote won the Joplin Award in the BlueCat Screenplay Competition and she was selected from thousands of screenwriters to participate in "The Black List" feature writing lab where she was mentored by screenwriters Max Borenstein and Jessica Bendinger. In 2017, she was included in Tracking Board’s “Young & Hungry” list, highlighting Hollywood’s most promising screenwriters.

In 2016, “Superfecundation”, a screenplay for a romantic comedy written by Einstein reached the semi-finals at the Academy Awards’ Nicholl Fellowships in Screenwriting and won second place at the CineStory Feature Screenplay Competition. In 2018, the script was sold to Sony’s Screen Gems and is being produced by Brownstone, Elizabeth Banks and Max Handelman’s production company

Screenplays
 2014 - The Longest Birthday (feature)
 2016 - Superfecundation (feature)
 2019 - Marriage Material (series, co-wrote with Oran Zegman)
 2020 - Staying Home (feature)

Awards

Advertising

Screenwriting

References

External links
 
 Constance Wu Could Star in Savion Einstein Comedy, mxdwn
 #SAVION EINSTEIN, womenandhollywood
 Spec Script Deal: “The Longest Birthday”, medium
 "ידעתי שמאיר ירים ידיים כשלא יוכל לשדר יותר", yediot
 Rumorville: Jordan Peele-Produced Nazi Hunter Amazon Series ‘The Hunt’ Eyes Its Lead + More Projects To Watch, Backstage
 "סוני" רכשה תסריט מסביון איינשטיין, בתו של מאיר איינשטיין, maariv

1982 births
Living people
Israeli female screenwriters
Israeli women writers
Israeli people of Polish-Jewish descent